Margaret Emma Faith Irwin (27 March 1889 – 11 December 1967) was an English historical novelist. She also wrote a factual biography of Sir Walter Raleigh.

Biography 
Irwin was born in Highgate Hill, London, to Andrew Clarke Irwin (a native of Perth, Western Australia, d. 1902) and Anna Julia Irwin (née Baker, d. 1899), the daughter of Col. George Baker of the 16th (Queens) Lancers. She was brought up by her uncle S. T. Irwin (Sidney Thomas Irwin), a master of Classics at Clifton College, then a boys' school. Irwin attended the nearby Clifton High School, a girls' school, in Bristol, after her parents died. She was educated at Clifton and at Oxford University, where she took a degree in English. She began writing books and short stories in the early 1920s. In 1929 she married children's author and illustrator John Robert Monsell, who created the covers for some of her books.

Her novels were esteemed for the accuracy of their historical research, and she became a noted authority on the Elizabethan and early Stuart era. One of her novels, Young Bess about the early years of Queen Elizabeth I, was made into a film of the same title starring Jean Simmons.

Irwin wrote several ghost stories (including "The Book" and "The Earlier Service"). Irwin also wrote two fantasy novels: Still She Wished For Company is about a magical time slip, while These Mortals is an adult fairy-tale about a wizard's daughter.

Bibliography

Single novels
How Many Miles to Babylon (1913)
Come Out To Play (1914)
Out Of The House (1916)
Still She Wished for Company (1924)
These Mortals (1925)
Knock Four Times (1927)
Fire Down Below (1928)
Royal Flush (1932)
The Stranger Prince: The Story of Rupert of the Rhine (1938)The Bride: The Story of Louise And Montrose (1939)None So Pretty: Or, the Story of Mr. Cork (1940)The Gay Galliard: The Story of Mary Queen of Scots (1941) Later published as The Galliard.Royal Flush: The Story of Minette (1948)The Proud Servant: A Story of Montrose (1949)

Queen Elizabeth TrilogyYoung Bess (1944)Elizabeth, Captive Princess (1948)Elizabeth and the Prince of Spain (1953)

Short storiesMadame Fears the Dark: Seven Stories and a Play (1935)Mrs. Oliver Cromwell and Other Stories (Chatto & Windus, London, 1940)Monsieur Seeks a Wife (1951)Bloodstock and Other Stories (1953)

BiographyThat Great Lucifer: A Portrait of Sir Walter Raleigh (1960)

Film adaptationsYoung Bess (1953) an adaptation of the book of the same title and Elizabeth, Captive Princess.
"The Doughty Plot" (1962) An episode of the television series Sir Francis Drake adapted from her own story and screenplay, co-written by Margaret Irwin.

References

Further reading
 Twentieth century romance and Historical Writers''. St James Press, 1994, pp. 340–1.

External links 

 
 
  – primarily as by "Irwin, Margaret" undifferentiated rather than "Irwin, Margaret, 1889–1967"

1889 births
1967 deaths
20th-century biographers
20th-century British short story writers
20th-century English novelists
20th-century English women writers
English biographers
English fantasy writers
English horror writers
English romantic fiction writers
English short story writers
English women non-fiction writers
English women novelists
Ghost story writers
People educated at Clifton High School, Bristol
Women biographers
Women historical novelists
Women horror writers
Women romantic fiction writers
Women science fiction and fantasy writers
Writers of historical fiction set in the early modern period
Writers of historical fiction set in the Middle Ages
Writers of historical romances